Mahdaviyeh (also Romanized as Mahdavīyeh; also known as Qal‘eh Mehdi Khān) is a village in Kamazan-e Sofla Rural District, Zand District, Malayer County, Hamadan Province, Iran. At the 2006 census, its population was 229, in 46 families.

References 

Populated places in Malayer County